The flag of Macedonia represents a Vergina Sun with 16 rays in the centre of a blue field. This flag, as well as the Vergina Sun, is commonly used as an unofficial symbol of the Greek region of Macedonia and its subdivisions. It is also used by organisations of the Greek Macedonian diaspora, such as the Pan-Macedonian Association chapters of the United States and Australia, as well as numerous commercial enterprises and private citizens.

Overview
The exact date of the flag's creation is not known, however it was most likely after the 1980s, after the Vergina Sun was discovered by Archaeologist Manolis Andronikos in a larnax made of gold, which was speculated to hold the remains of Philip II of Macedon. 

The Vergina Sun is an official state emblem of Greece, and the Greek government proceeded to lodge a copyright claim as a state symbol at the World Intellectual Property Organization in 1995. No such provisions have been made for the flag of Macedonia however, which remains unofficial.

It is unclear when the flag was adopted, but it was most likely in use by the late 1980s after the archaeological discovery of the star by Manolis Andronikos in Vergina. The similarity of the first flag of North Macedonia, then the Republic of Macedonia, following its independence from Yugoslavia 1992 had the same design as the flag of Greek Macedonia, but on a red background with proportions 1:2. This caused controversy in Greece, which was already using that symbol for its own province of Macedonia, and the then Republic of Macedonia changed its flag to the current design in 1995.

See also 
 Flag of Greece
 List of Greek flags
 Flag of North Macedonia
 Flags of country subdivisions

References

External links 

 

Flags of Greece
Flag Of Macedonia (Greece)
Flag
Flag of Macedonia (Greece)